Heartbeat  is a 2012 Austrian short film directed by Romana Carén, about a happily married couple learning about a life changing diagnosis. The film is based on the stage play "Wintervögel" which had its world premiere in 2010 at the Theater Drachengasse.

Plot
Emilia and Bernhard Janes are over the moon when they learn that they are finally expecting a child. During a routine check they are confronted with a terrifying diagnoses.
Emilia has cancer. Her chances to survive are good, but therefore she will have to start with the treatment immediately. The doctor suggests an abortion. While Bernhard is willing to sacrifice the baby in order to save his wife's life, Emilia is already too attached to the baby. Time is running.

Cast
 Romana Carén - Emilia Janes
 Valentin Schreyer - Bernhard Janes
 Katrine Eichberger - Doctor Wagner

References

External links 
 
 

2012 films
2012 drama films
Films directed by Romana Carén
Austrian short films
2012 short films
Austrian drama films